Madrasi is an ethnic slur used against the people of South India.

Madrasi may also refer to:
 Madrasi (2006 film), Indian Tamil-language film
 Madirasi (2012 film), Indian Malayalam-language film
 Asura (2015 film) formerly titled Madrasi, Indian Telugu-language film
 Madrasi chess, a chess variant invented in 1979
 Madrasa (grape), a variety of grape
 Madrasi Highflyer, breed of pigeon from India
 Madrasi Para, neighborhood of Karachi, Pakistan
 Maulvi Ahmadullah Shah Faizabadi Madrasi or Ahmadullah Shah (1787–1858), Indian freedom fighter

See also 

 Madras (disambiguation)